Muzeum Těšínska is a regional museum in Český Těšín, Czech Republic. It focuses on the history and traditions of the region of Cieszyn Silesia. The museum was founded in 1948 by teacher Ladislav Báča.

It has 12 regional branches and show rooms. Thanks to its regional branch in Jablunkov it is the easternmost professional museum in the Czech Republic. The museum cooperates with Muzeum Śląska Cieszyńskiego and Książnica Cieszyńska in the neighbouring Cieszyn in Poland.

Since 1957 the museum publishes the Těšínsko magazine. Current director is Zbyšek Ondřeka.

References

Further reading

External links
 

Museums in the Moravian-Silesian Region
Český Těšín
History museums in the Czech Republic
Museums established in 1948
1948 establishments in Czechoslovakia
20th-century architecture in the Czech Republic